Gregorio Andrés Romero is an American politician and educator serving as a member of the New Mexico House of Representatives from the 10th district.

Early life and education

Romero was born and raised in Albuquerque, New Mexico. He earned a Bachelor of Arts degree in philosophy in 2010 and a Master of Arts in history from the University of New Mexico in 2015.

Career 
Romero is a social studies teacher at Atrisco Heritage Academy High School.

In 2014, Romero ran for election to represent the 10th district in the New Mexico House of Representatives, replacing Henry Saavedra, who had decided not to run for re-election. He won a three-way Democratic primary, and went on to win the general election with 58.1% of the vote. Since then, he has been re-elected twice, and is seeking election to a fourth term in 2020.

Romero sits on the following standing House committees:
 Education (Chair)
 Transportation, Public Works & Capital Improvements
 Rules & Order of Business

Personal life 
He and his wife, Athena, have two children.

Electoral record

2014

2016

In 2016, Romero was unopposed in the Democratic primary.

2018

In 2018, Romero was unopposed in both the Democratic primary and the general election.

References

Living people
Hispanic and Latino American state legislators in New Mexico
Democratic Party members of the New Mexico House of Representatives
Year of birth missing (living people)
People from Albuquerque, New Mexico
University of New Mexico alumni
Educators from New Mexico
21st-century American politicians